Nan Madol is an album by  Finnish avant-garde jazz composer, bandleader and drummer Edward Vesala originally released on the JAPO label in 1974 and re-released on the ECM label in 1976.

Reception
The Allmusic review by Michael G. Nastos awarded the album 4½ stars stating "Leader plays percussion, flutes, harp. With Finnish friends in duo to large-ensemble contexts".

Track listing
All compositions by Edward Vesala
 "Nan Madol" - 6:02 
 "Love for Living" - 3:47 
 "Call from the Sea" - 1:58 
 "The Way of..." - 12:09 
 "Areous Vlor Ta" - 12:38 
 "The Wind" - 9:23 
Recorded at Alppi Studio in Helsinki, Finland on April 25 and 26, 1974

Personnel
Edward Vesala - drums, percussion, flute, harp 
Teppo Hauta-aho - bass, voice (tracks 1, & 4-6) 
Sakari Kukko - flute (track 1) 
Elisabeth Leistola - harp (track 4) 
Charlie Mariano - alto saxophone, flute (tracks 5 & 6) 
Pentti Lahti - soprano saxophone, bass clarinet (tracks 5 & 6) 
Seppo Paakkunainen - soprano saxophone, flute (tracks 5 & 6) 
Juhani Aaltonen - tenor saxophone, soprano saxophone, flute, piccolo flute, bells, voice (tracks: 1, 2, & 4-6) 
Mircea Stan - trombone (track 5) 
Kaj Backlund - trumpet (tracks 1, 4 & 5) 
Juhani Poutanen - violin, viola, voice (tracks 1 & 4-6)

References

ECM Records albums
Edward Vesala albums
1974 albums
Albums produced by Manfred Eicher